Kyaik Ne Yay Lae Pagoda() is a Buddhist pagoda located in the mid of ocean in Wekalaung village of Thanbyuzayat township in Mon state of Myanmar. When tide becomes high, the pagoda is disconnected from the local village. The pagoda is visited by Buddhist pilgrims mainly on the second full of Tan Saung Mon. It is believed that the blessings of Lord Buddha helps to reduce the flow and open the way for the pilgrims to the pagoda. The pagoda was built by King Thirimathaka (Ashoka in burmese language).

Incidents
In 2021, due to sudden rise in the tide, 15 were dead and several pilgrims were injured as they were washed by water on the way to the pagoda.

References

Pagodas in Myanmar